Westminster, Ontario, may refer to:

Westminster, a community in Alfred and Plantagenet, a township in eastern Ontario, Canada
Westminster, Middlesex County, Ontario (formerly Westminster Township, Ontario)
Westminster, Middlesex County, Ontario, a neighbourhood in the City of London and the larger area including the neighbourhood